Denis John Gorey (25 May 1874 – 20 February 1940) was an Irish politician who served for nearly twenty years as Teachta Dála (TD), first as leader of the Farmers' Party, then for Cumann na nGaedheal, and finally for Fine Gael.

Gorey was first elected to the 3rd Dáil at the 1922 general election for the Carlow–Kilkenny constituency, taking his seat as leader of the Farmers' Party, which won seven seats.

He was re-elected at the 1923 general election, leading the Farmers' Party to a new high of 15 seats in the 4th Dáil. However, with the anti-Treaty TDs abstaining from Dáil Éireann, the party remained in opposition to the Cumann na nGaedheal government of W. T. Cosgrave.

Gorey left the Farmers' Party and fought the June 1927 general election as a Cumann na nGaedheal candidate, winning election to the 5th Dáil. He lost his seat at the September 1927 general election.  However, he was re-elected at the by-election on 3 November 1927 after W. T. Cosgrave, who had been elected both for Carlow–Kilkenny and Cork Borough, chose to represent Cork Borough.

At the 1932 general election, he was re-elected with a share of the first-preference vote below 6%, relying on transfers for other candidates to reach the quota as the last of five TDs to be elected. He lost his seat again at the 1933 general election, but was returned at the 1937 general election to the 9th Dáil, for the new Kilkenny constituency, where he was returned again at the 1938 general election.

After his death on 20 February 1940 at the age of 65, no by-election was held for his seat, which remained vacant until the 1943 general election.

Anti-Semitic Quotes

References

1874 births
1943 deaths
Antisemitism in Ireland
Cumann na nGaedheal TDs
Farmers' Party (Ireland) TDs
Fine Gael TDs
Members of the 3rd Dáil
Members of the 4th Dáil
Members of the 5th Dáil
Members of the 6th Dáil
Members of the 7th Dáil
Members of the 9th Dáil
Members of the 10th Dáil
Irish farmers